The Men's double FITA round C1-C2 was an archery competition in the 1984 Summer Paralympics.

Canadian archer David Barefoot won the gold medal unopposed.

Results

References

1984 Summer Paralympics events